Gabriel Mead Tooker (December 12, 1839 – December 11, 1905) was an American lawyer and clubman who was prominent in New York Society during the Gilded Age.

Early life
Tooker was born on December 12, 1839, in New York City.  He was the third of seven children born to John F. Tooker (1807–1849) and Mary A. (née Mead) Tooker (b. 1811), who married in 1835.  His maternal grandfather was William Mead of Greenwich, Connecticut. He was the uncle of Anna Tooker Best, who was also prominent in New York and Newport society.

He graduated with an A.M. degree from Columbia College in 1859 and a LL.B. degree in 1861.

Career
Tooker's family was prominent as merchants in New York City with the firm Tooker, Mead & Company. The firm had been run by his parents families.  Tooker was a lawyer, with an office at 23 Nassau Street in lower Manhattan, who was also known as a successful investor.

Society life
In 1892, the widower Tooker was included in Ward McAllister's "Four Hundred", purported to be an index of New York's best families, published in The New York Times. Conveniently, 400 was the number of people that could fit into Mrs. Astor's ballroom.  He was a member of the New-York Historical Society, and an active member of the Reading Room, a gentlemen's club in Newport.

The Tookers owned one of the finest homes in Newport, Rhode Island, referred to as the "Tooker villa", at Kay and Bellevue Avenue, and took part in prominent society there.  In 1895, following the marriage of his youngest daughter Emily, Tooker gifts the house, including all its furnishings, chandeliers, and draperies, to his children, who promptly divided the contents and sold the home.  His elder daughter was considered the "beauty of the family" and his younger daughter Emily, who was "not in the least bit pretty," was reportedly engaged to A. Lanfear Norrie.

Personal life
On December 2, 1862, Tooker was married to Margaret Augusta Peckham (1843–1888), the daughter of Dr. Walton Hazard Peckham and Margaret (née Milderburger) Stuyvesant Peckham.  Margaret was the first cousin of biologist George William Peckham and Supreme Court Justice Rufus Wheeler Peckham and niece of U.S. Representative Rufus W. Peckham and District Attorney Wheeler H. Peckham, all descendants of George Hazard, a Governor of the Colony of Rhode Island. The Tookers New York residence was at 675 Fifth Avenue. Together, they were the parents of:

 Charlotte Augusta Tooker (1864–1951), who married architect Whitney Warren (1864–1943) of Warren and Wetmore, in 1884.
 John Stansbury "Jack" Tooker (b. 1866), an 1890 Harvard graduate who married Maud Somerville Jaffray (1871–1947) in 1903.
 Emily Montague Tooker (1872–1903), who married J. Wadsworth Ritchie (1861–1924), son of Cornelia Adair and grandson of General James S. Wadsworth, in 1895.

His wife died in Rome, Italy, on February 4, 1888.  Tooker died on December 11, 1905, at Monte Carlo in Monaco, after having lived abroad for twenty years.  He was buried alongside his wife in Rome, however, a memorial was place at Island Cemetery in Newport, Rhode Island.

Descendants
Through his daughter Charlotte, he was the grandfather of Charlotte Augusta Warren (1885–1957), who married William Greenough, and Whitney Warren Jr. (1898–1986), who was a horticulturalist and patron of the arts.  Warren Jr. was referred to as "an overly rich bachelor operating in San Francisco" who traveled around the world.

References

External links

1839 births
1905 deaths
Columbia College (New York) alumni
Columbia Law School alumni
Lawyers from New York City
People included in New York Society's Four Hundred
People from Turtle Bay, Manhattan